USNS Fisher (T-AKR-301) is a Bob Hope-class roll on roll off vehicle cargo ship of the United States Navy. She was built by Northrop Grumman Ship Systems, New Orleans and delivered to the Navy on 4 August 1998. They assigned her to the United States Department of Defense's Military Sealift Command. Fisher is named for Zachary and Elizabeth Fisher, and is one of 11 Surge LMSRs operated by a private company under contract to the Military Sealift Command. When not operational Fisher was formerly berthed at Baltimore. She is assigned to the MSC Atlantic surge force and is maintained at a 96-hour readiness status, however sits in Puget Sound Naval Shipyard in Bremerton, Washington.

Google satellite and Street View imagery show that in 2014 and 2015 she was at Drydock 3 of the Boston Marine Industrial Park.

References

Further reading

Auxiliary ships of the United States
Bob Hope-class vehicle cargo ships
1997 ships
Ships built in New Orleans